The 1989–90 Yugoslav Ice Hockey League season was the 48th season of the Yugoslav Ice Hockey League, the top level of ice hockey in Yugoslavia. Six teams participated in the league, and Medveščak have won the championship.

Final ranking
Medveščak
Jesenice
Olimpija
Partizan
Red Star
Vojvodina Novi Sad

External links
Season on eurohockey.com
Yugoslav Ice Hockey League seasons

1989-90
Yugo
1989–90 in Yugoslav ice hockey